Giuliana Savaris (born 22 January 1959) is a former Italian female mountain runner who won a medal at individual senior level  at the World Mountain Running Championships.

See also
 Italy at the World Mountain Running Championships

References

External links
 Latteria Lentiai 

1959 births
Living people
Italian female mountain runners